BAUHAUS-galan, formerly known as DN-Galan is an annual, international athletics meeting that takes place at the Olympic Stadium in Stockholm. Previously it was one of the five IAAF Super Grand Prix events until 2010, and has since been part of the Diamond League circuit. It was first organized in 1967.

Having been known as the DN-Galan since its first edition, a title sponsor deal with DIY company Bauhaus led to a rebranding of the event in 2015, following a period of financial instability for the organisers.

Since 1967, the Dicksonpokalen (Dickson Trophy) is awarded to the winner of the men's 1500 metres or mile run at the competition.

History
After the 2019 season concluded the BAUHAUS-galan was announced to be separating from the professional Diamond League circuit of one-day meets. However, the meet was readmitted into the circuit and included in the Diamond League's 2020 calendar announcement.

World records
Over the course of its history, numerous world records have been set at the meet.

Meeting records

Men

Women

Notes

References

External links
Official website (in Swedish)
Diamond League - Stockholm Official Web Site
DN Galan Records
The event at SVT's open archive 

Diamond League
IAAF Super Grand Prix
IAAF Grand Prix
Sport in Stockholm
Athletics competitions in Sweden
Recurring sporting events established in 1967
Summer events in Sweden
IAAF World Outdoor Meetings